Anne-Flore Marxer (born 24 January 1984) is a Swiss-French snowboarder.

Born in Lausanne, Switzerland, Marxer grew up in Preverenges, starting snowboarding at an early age as soon as she could walk. She started competing in 2004. In 2011, she won the Freeride World Tour.

References

1984 births
Living people
Swiss female snowboarders
Sportspeople from Lausanne